Second-seeded Bob Lutz and Stan Smith won the title, defeating top-seeds Bob Hewitt and Raúl Ramírez in the final.

Draw

Draw

References
General

Specific

1977 Alan King Tennis Classic